Jihad is an Arabic word which literally means "striving" or "struggling", especially with a praiseworthy aim. In an Islamic context, it can refer to almost any effort to make personal and social life conform with God's guidance, such as struggle against one's evil inclinations, proselytizing, or efforts toward the moral betterment of the Muslim community (Ummah), though it is most frequently associated with war. In classical Islamic law (sharia), the term refers to armed struggle against unbelievers, while modernist Islamic scholars generally equate military jihad with defensive warfare. In Sufi circles, spiritual and moral jihad has been traditionally emphasized under the name of greater jihad. The term has gained additional attention in recent decades through its use by various insurgent Islamic extremist, militant Islamist, and terrorist individuals and organizations whose ideology is based on the Islamic notion of jihad.

The word jihad appears frequently in the Qur'an with and without military connotations, often in the idiomatic expression "striving in the path of God (al-jihad fi sabil Allah)", conveying a sense of self-exertion. They developed an elaborate set of rules pertaining to jihad, including prohibitions on harming those who are not engaged in combat.
In the modern era, the notion of jihad has lost its jurisprudential relevance and instead given rise to an ideological and political discourse. While modernist Islamic scholars have emphasized the defensive and non-military aspects of jihad, some Islamists have advanced aggressive interpretations that go beyond the classical theory.

Jihad is classified into inner ("greater") jihad, which involves a struggle against one's own base impulses, and external ("lesser") jihad, which is further subdivided into jihad of the pen/tongue (debate or persuasion) and jihad of the sword. Most Western writers consider external jihad to have primacy over inner jihad in the Islamic tradition, while much of contemporary Muslim opinion favors the opposite view. Gallup analysis of a large survey reveals considerable nuance in the conceptions of jihad held by Muslims around the world.

The sense of jihad as armed resistance was first used in the context of persecution faced by Muslims, as when Muhammad was at Mecca, when the community had two choices: emigration (hijra) or jihad. In Twelver Shi'a Islam, jihad is one of the ten Practices of the Religion. A person engaged in jihad is called a mujahid (plural: mujahideen). The term jihad is often rendered in English as "Holy War", although this translation is controversial. Today, the word jihad is often used without religious connotations, like the English crusade.

Etymology and literary origins

The term jihad is derived from the Arabic root jahada, meaning "to exert strength and effort, to use all means in order to accomplish a task". In its expanded sense, it can be fighting the enemies of Islam, as well as adhering to religious teachings, enjoining good and forbidding evil. The peaceful sense of "efforts towards the moral uplift of society or towards the spread of Islam" can be known as "jihad of the tongue" or "jihad of the pen", as opposed to "jihad of the sword". It is used as a term in fiqh (Islamic jurisprudence) mostly in the latter sense, while in Sufism mostly in the sense of fighting the nafs al-ammara, which is the psychological state of being consumed by your own desires. Spiritual and moral jihad is generally emphasized in pious and mystical circles.

The Hans Wehr Dictionary of Modern Written Arabic defines the term as "fight, battle; jihad, holy war (against the infidels, as a religious duty)". However, given the range of meanings, it is incorrect to equate it simply with "holy war". The notion of jihad has its origins in the Islamic idea that the whole humankind will embrace Islam. In the Qur'an and in later Muslim usage, jihad is commonly followed by the expression fi sabil illah, "in the path of God." Muhammad Abdel-Haleem states that it indicates "the way of truth and justice, including all the teachings it gives on the justifications and the conditions for the conduct of war and peace."

In Modern Standard Arabic, the term jihad is used for a struggle for causes, both religious and secular. 
It is sometimes used without religious connotation, with a meaning similar to the English word "crusade" (as in "a crusade against drugs"). Jihad is also used quite commonly in Arabic countries, in the neutral sense of "a struggle for a noble cause", as a unisex name given to children. Nonetheless, jihad is usually used in the religious sense and its beginnings are traced back to the Qur'an and the words and actions of Muhammad.

Quran
Jihad is mentioned in four places in the Qur'an as a noun, while its derived verb is used in twenty-four places. Mujahid, the active participle meaning "jihadist", is mentioned in two verses. In some of these mentions (see At-Tawbah 9/41, 44, 81, 86), it is understood that the word jihad directly refers to war, and in others, jihad is used in the sense of "the effort to live in accordance with Allah's will". Quranic exhortions to jihad have been interpreted by Islamic scholars both in the combative and non-combative sense. Ahmed al-Dawoody writes that there seventeen references to or derivatices of jihad occur altogether forty-one times in eleven Meccan texts and thirty Medinan ones, with 28 mentions related to religious belief or spiritual struggle and 13 mentions related to warfare or physical struggle.

Hadith
There are also many hadiths (records of the teachings, deeds and sayings of the Islamic prophet Muhammad) about jihad, typically under the headings of kitab al-jihad (book of jihad) or faza'il al-jihad (virtues of jihad) in hadith collections or as the subject of independent works. Of the 199 hadith references to jihad in the Bukhari collection of hadith, all assume that jihad means warfare.

Among reported sayings of the Islamic prophet Muhammad involving jihad are

and

Ibn Nuhaas also cited a hadith from Musnad Ahmad ibn Hanbal, where Muhammad states that the highest kind of jihad is "The person who is killed whilst spilling the last of his blood" (Ahmed 4/144).

According to another hadith, supporting one's parents is also an example of jihad. It has also been reported that Muhammad considered performing hajj well to be the best jihad for Muslim women.

The hadith emphasize jihad as one of the means to Paradise. All sins (except debt) would be forgiven for the one dies in it. Participation in jihad had to be voluntary and intention must be pure, for jihad is only waged for the sake of God not for material wealth. On the contrary, jihad required man to put both his life and wealth at risk. Jihad is ranked as one of the highest good deeds; according to one hadith it is the third best deed after prayer and being good to one's parents. One hadith exempts military jihad on men whose parents are alive, as serving one's parents is considered a superior jihad.

Greater and Lesser jihad
Jihad has traditionally been divided into "greater jihad" (inner struggle against sinful behavior) and "lesser jihad" (military sense). Early Islamic thought considered non-violent interpretations of jihad, especially for those Muslims who could not partake in warfare in distant lands. Most classical writings use the term jihad in the military sense. The tradition differentiating between the “greater and lesser jihad” is not included in any of the authoritative compilations of Hadith. In consequence, some Islamists dismiss it as not authentic.

The most commonly cited hadith for "greater jihad" is: 
A number of fighters came to Muhammad and he said "You have come from the 'lesser jihad' to the 'greater jihad'." The fighters asked "what is the greater jihad?" Muhammad replied, "It is the struggle against one's passions."

This was also cited in The History of Baghdad by Al-Khatib al-Baghdadi, an 11th-century Islamic scholar. This reference gave rise to the distinguishing of two forms of jihad: "greater" and "lesser". Some Islamic scholars, such as Ibn Hajar al-Asqalani, consider the hadith to have a weak chain of transmission.

The concept has had "enormous influence" in Islamic mysticism (Sufism).

Ibn Hazm, lists four kinds of jihad fi sabilillah (struggle in the cause of God):
 Jihad of the heart (jihad bil qalb/nafs) is concerned with combatting the devil and in the attempt to escape his persuasion to evil. This type of Jihad was regarded as the greater jihad (al-jihad al-akbar).
 Jihad by the tongue (jihad bil lisan) (also Jihad by the word, jihad al-qalam) is concerned with speaking the truth and spreading the word of Islam with one's tongue.
 Jihad by the hand (jihad bil yad) refers to choosing to do what is right and to combat injustice and what is wrong with action.
 Jihad by the sword (jihad bis saif) refers to qital fi sabilillah (armed fighting in the way of God, or holy war), the most common usage by Salafi Muslims and offshoots of the Muslim Brotherhood.

A related hadith tradition that has "found its way into popular Muslim literature", and which has been said to "embody the Muslim mindset" of the Islamic Golden Age (the period from the mid-8th century to mid-13th century following the relocation of the Abbasid capital from Damascus to Baghdad), is: 

The belief in the veracity of this hadith was a contributing factor in the efforts by successive caliphs to subsidize translations of "Greek, Hebrew and Syriac science and philosophy texts", and the saying continues to be heavily emphasised to this day in certain Islamic traditions advocating intellectualism over violence, for example in Timbuktu, where it is central to one of two key lessons in the work Tuhfat al-fudala by the 16th-century Berber scholar Ahmed Baba. In general, however, fewer people today are aware of the hadith, which suffers from "a general lack of knowledge", according to Akbar Ahmed.

According to classical Islamic scholars like Ibn Qayyim al-Jawziyya, Jihad is against four types of enemies: the lower self (nafs), Satan, the unbelievers, and the hypocrites. The first two types of Jihad are purely peaceful spiritual struggles. According to Ibn Qayyim "Jihad against the lower self precedes jihad against external enemies". Confirming the central importance of the spiritual aspect of Jihad, Ibn Taymiyyah writes:

Engaging in the greater jihad did not preclude engaging in the lesser jihad. Abd al-Qadir al-Jilani recommended his followers to pursue both the greater and the lesser jihads.

At least one important contemporary Twelver Shia figure, Ayatollah Ruhollah Khomeini, the leader of the Iranian Revolution and the founder of the Islamic Republic of Iran, wrote a treatise on the "Greater Jihad" (i.e., internal/personal struggle against sin).

Defensive and offensive jihad

Classical scholars discussed justifications for jihad, including waging it defensively vs offensively. However, classical jurists paid more attention to conduct of war jus in bello (see next section) than justification of war jus ad bellum. The decision of when to wage war was often viewed as a political decision best left to political authorities.

Two justifications for jihad were given: defensive war against external aggression, or an offensive or preemptive attack against an enemy state. According to the majority of jurists, the casus belli (justifications for war) are restricted to aggression against Muslims, and fitna—persecution of Muslims because of their religious belief. They hold that unbelief in itself is not a justification for war. These jurists therefore maintain that only combatants are to be fought; noncombatants such as women, children, clergy, the aged, the insane, farmers, serfs, the blind, and so on are not to be killed in war. Thus, the Hanafī Ibn Najīm states: "the reason for jihād in our [the Hanafīs] view is kawnuhum harbā ‛alaynā [literally, their being at war against us]." The Hanafī jurists al-Shaybānī state that "although kufr [unbelief in God] is one of the greatest sins, it is between the individual and his God the Almighty and the punishment for this sin is to be postponed to the dār al-jazā’, (the abode of reckoning, the Hereafter)," and al-Sarakhsī  says something similar. Offensive jihad involved forays into enemy territory either for conquest, and thus enlarging the Muslim political order, or to dissuade the enemy from attacking Muslim lands.

Shia and Sunni theories of jihad are similar, except that Shias consider offensive jihad to be valid only under the leadership of the Mahdi, who is currently believed to be in occultation but will return at some point in the future. However, defensive jihad is permissible in Shia Islam before the Mahdi's return. In fact, Shia scholars emphasized it was a religious duty for Shia to defend all Muslims (including Sunni Muslims) from outside invaders.

Rules of warfare
Rules prohibit attacking or molesting non-combatants, which include women, children under the age of Puberty, elderly men, people with disabilities and those who are sick. Diplomats, merchants and peasants are similarly immune from being attacked. Monks are presumed to be non-combatants and thus have immunity too; similarly places of worship should not be attacked. Even if the enemy disregarded the immunity of noncombatants, Muslims could not respond in kind. However, these categories lose their immunity if they participate in fighting, planning or supplying the enemy. Some jurists argued that immunity was more related to noncombatant status than being in a certain demographic class. For example, Muhaqqiq al-Hilli opined that only old men are only immune from being killed if they neither fight, nor take a role in military decision making.

Up until the Crusades, Muslim jurists disallowed the use of mangonels because the weapon killed indiscriminately with the potential of harming noncombatants. But during Crusades this ruling was reversed out of military need. Jurists also grappled with the question of attacking an enemy that used women, children or Muslims as human shields. Most jurists held that it was permissible to attack the enemy in cases of military necessity, but steps should be taken to direct at the attack towards the combatants and avoiding the human shield. Abu Hanifa argued that if Muslims stopped combat for fear of killing noncombatants, then such a rule would make fighting impossible, as every city had civilians.  Mutilating the dead bodies of the enemy is prohibited.

There are two conflicting rulings on destruction of enemy property. In one military battle, Prophet Muhammad ordered the destruction of an enemy's palm trees as a means of ending a siege without bloodshed. By contrast, Abu Bakr prohibited destruction of trees, buildings and livestock. Most jurists did not allow unnecessary destruction of enemy property, but allowed it in cases of military necessity, such as destroying buildings in which the enemy is taking shelter. Some jurists also allowed destruction if it would weaken the enemy or win the war. Many jurists cautioned against "unnecessary devastation", not just out of humanitarian concerns, but practical ones: it is more useful to capture an enemy's property than to destroy it. Islamic scholars prohibited killing animals, unless due to military necessity (such as killing horses in battle). This is because, unlike other enemy property, animals are capable of feeling pain.

History of usage and practice

In pre-Islamic Arabia, Bedouins conducted raids against enemy tribes and settlements to collect spoils. According to some scholars (such as James Turner Johnson), while Islamic leaders "instilled into the hearts of the warriors the belief" in jihad "holy war" and ghaza (raids), the "fundamental structure" of this bedouin warfare "remained, ... raiding to collect booty".
According to Jonathan Berkey, the Quran's statements in support of jihad may have originally been directed against Muhammad's local enemies, the pagans of Mecca or the Jews of Medina, but these same statements could be redirected once new enemies appeared.
According to another scholar (Majid Khadduri), it was the shift in focus to the conquest and spoils collecting of non-Bedouin unbelievers and away from traditional inter-bedouin tribal raids, that may have made it possible for Islam not only to expand but to avoid self-destruction.

Classical
The primary aim of jihad as warfare is not the conversion of non-Muslims to Islam by force, but rather the expansion and defense of the Islamic state. In theory, jihad was to continue until "all mankind either embraced Islam or submitted to the authority of the Muslim state." There could be truces before this was achieved, but no permanent peace. One who died "on the path of God" was a martyr (shahid), whose sins were remitted and who was secured "immediate entry to paradise".

According with Bernard Lewis, "from an early date Muslim law laid down" jihad in the military sense as "one of the principal obligations" of both "the head of the Muslim state", who declared the jihad, and the Muslim community. According to legal historian Sadakat Kadri, Islamic jurists first developed classical doctrine of jihad "towards the end of the eighth century", using the doctrine of naskh (that God gradually improved His revelations over the course of Muhammed's mission) they subordinated verses in the Quran emphasizing harmony to more the more "confrontational" verses of Muhammad's later years and linked verses on exertion (jihad) to those of fighting (qital). Muslims jurists of the eighth century developed a paradigm of international relations that divides the world into three conceptual divisions, dar al-Islam/dar al-‛adl/dar al-salam (house of Islam/house of justice/house of peace), dar al-harb/dar al-jawr (house of war/house of injustice, oppression), and dar al-sulh/dar al-‛ahd/dār al-muwada‛ah (house of peace/house of covenant/house of reconciliation). The second/eighth century jurist Sufyan al-Thawri (d. 161/778) headed what Khadduri calls a pacifist school, which maintained that jihad was only a defensive war. He also states that the jurists who held this position, among whom he refers to Hanafi jurists al-Awza‛i (d. 157/774) and Malik ibn Anas (d. 179/795), and other early jurists, "stressed that tolerance should be shown unbelievers, especially scripturaries and advised the Imam to prosecute war only when the inhabitants of the dar al-harb came into conflict with Islam." The duty of Jihad was a collective one (fard al-kifaya). It was to be directed only by the caliph who might delayed it when convenient, negotiating truces for up to ten years at a time. Within classical Islamic jurisprudence—the development of which is to be dated into—the first few centuries after the prophet's death—jihad consisted of wars against unbelievers, apostates, and was the only form of warfare permissible. (Another source—Bernard Lewis—states that fighting rebels and bandits was legitimate though not a form of jihad, and that while the classical perception and presentation of the jihad was warfare in the field against a foreign enemy, internal jihad "against an infidel renegade, or otherwise illegitimate regime was not unknown.")

However, some argue martyrdom is never automatic because it is within God's exclusive province to judge who is worthy of that designation.

Classical manuals of Islamic jurisprudence often contained a section called Book of Jihad, with rules governing the conduct of war covered at great length. Such rules include treatment of nonbelligerents, women, children (also cultivated or residential areas), and division of spoils. Such rules offered protection for civilians. Spoils include Ghanimah (spoils obtained by actual fighting), and fai (obtained without fighting i.e. when the enemy surrenders or flees).

The first documentation of the law of jihad was written by 'Abd al-Rahman al-Awza'i and Muhammad ibn al-Hasan al-Shaybani. (It grew out of debates that surfaced following Muhammad's death.)
Although some Islamic scholars have differed on the implementation of Jihad, there is consensus amongst them that the concept of jihad will always include armed struggle against persecution and oppression.

Both Ibn Taymiyya and Ibn Qayyim asserted that Muhammad never initiated any hostilities and that all the wars he engaged in were primarily defensive. He never forced non-Muslims to Islam and upheld the truces with non-Muslims so long as they didn't violate them. Ibn Taymiyya's views on Jihad are explained in his treatise titled Qāʿidah mukhtaṣarah fī qitāl al-kuffār wa muhādanatuhum wa taḥrīm qatlahum li mujarrad kufrihim. (An abridged rule on fighting the unbelievers and making truces with them, and the prohibition of killing them merely because of their unbelief) According to Ibn Taymiyya, every human blood is inviolable by default, except "by right of justice". Although Ibn Taymiyya authorised offensive Jihad ( Jihad al-Talab) against enemies who threaten Muslims or obstruct their citizens from freely accepting Islam, unbelief (Kufr) by itself is not a justification for violence, whether against individuals or states. According to Ibn Taymīyah, jihad is a legitimate reaction to military aggression by unbelievers and not merely due to religious differences. Ibn Taymiyya writes:"As for the transgressor who does not fight, there are no texts in which Allah commands him to be fought. Rather, the unbelievers are only fought on the condition that they wage war, as is practiced by the majority of scholars and is evident in the Book and Sunnah."

As important as jihad was, it has not been considered one of the "pillars of Islam". According to one scholar (Majid Khadduri, this is because the five pillars are individual obligations, but jihad is a "collective obligation" of the whole Muslim community meant to be carried out by the Islamic state. This was the belief of "all jurists, with almost no exception", but did not apply to defense of the Muslim community from a sudden attack, in which case jihad was and "individual obligation" of all believers, including women and children.

Scholars had previously assumed it was the responsibility of a centralized government to organize jihad. But this changed as the authority of the Abbasid caliph weakened. Al-Mawardi allowed local governors to wage jihad on the caliph's behalf. This decentralization of jihad became especially pressing after the Crusades. Ali ibn Tahir al-Sulami argued that all Muslims were responsible for waging wars of self-defense. Al-Sulami encouraged Muslim rulers from distant lands to assist those Muslims being invaded.

Classical Shia doctrine maintained defensive jihad was always permissible, but offensive jihad required the presence of the Imam. An exception to this, during medieval times, was when the first Fatimid caliph Abdallah al-Mahdi Billah claimed to be the representative of the Imam and claimed the right to launch offensive jihad.

After the Mongol invasions, Shia scholar Muhaqqiq al-Hilli made defensive war not just permissible but praiseworthy, even obligatory. If a Muslim could not take part in the defense then he should, at least, send material support. This remained the case even if the Muslims were ruled by an unjust ruler.

Early Muslim conquests

In the early era that inspired classical Islam (Rashidun Caliphate) and lasted less than a century, jihad spread the realm of Islam to include millions of subjects, and an area extending "from the borders of India and China to the Pyrenees and the Atlantic". The role of religion in these early conquests is debated. Medieval Arabic authors believed the conquests were commanded by God, and presented them as orderly and disciplined, under the command of the caliph. Many modern historians question whether hunger and desertification, rather than jihad, was a motivating force in the conquests. The famous historian William Montgomery Watt argued that "Most of the participants in the [early Islamic] expeditions probably thought of nothing more than booty ... There was no thought of spreading the religion of Islam." Similarly, Edward J. Jurji argues that the motivations of the Arab conquests were certainly not "for the propagation of Islam ... Military advantage, economic desires, [and] the attempt to strengthen the hand of the state and enhance its sovereignty ... are some of the determining factors." Some recent explanations cite both material and religious causes in the conquests.

Post-Classical usage
According to some authors, the more spiritual definitions of jihad developed sometime after the 150 years of jihad wars and Muslim territorial expansion, and particularly after the Mongol invaders sacked Baghdad and overthrew the Abbasid Caliphate. The historian Hamilton Gibb states that "in the historic [Muslim] Community the concept of jihad had gradually weakened and at length it had been largely reinterpreted in terms of Sufi ethics." Johnson notes that "despite the theoretical importance of the idea of jihad in classical Islamic juristic thought", by the time of the Abbasids, the concept was no longer central to statecraft.

Rudolph Peters also wrote that with the stagnation of Islamic expansionism, the concept of jihad became internalized as a moral or spiritual struggle. Earlier classical works on fiqh emphasized jihad as war for God's religion, Peters found. Later Islamic scholars like Ibn al-Amir al-San'ani, Muhammad Abduh, Rashid Rida, Ubaidullah Sindhi, Yusuf al-Qaradawi, Shibli Nomani, etc. emphasized the defensive aspect of Jihad, distinguishing between defensive Jihad ( jihad al-daf) and offensive Jihad ( Jihad al-talab or Jihad of choice ). They refuted the notion of consensus on Jihad al-talab being a communal obligation( fard kifaya ). In support of this view, these scholars referred to the works of classical scholars such as Al-Jassas, Ibn Taymiyyah, etc. According to Ibn Taymiyya, the reason for Jihad against non-Muslims is not their disbelief, but the threat they pose to Muslims. Citing Ibn Taymiyya, scholars like Rashid Rida, Al San'ani, Qaradawi, etc. argues that unbelievers need not be fought unless they pose a threat to Muslims. Thus, Jihad is obligatory only as a defensive warfare to respond to aggression or "perfidy" against the Muslim community, and that the "normal and desired state" between Islamic and non-Islamic territories was one of "peaceful coexistence." This was similar to the Western concept of a "Just war". Similarly the 18th-century Islamic scholar Muhammad ibn Abd al-Wahhab defined Jihad as a defensive military action to protect the Muslim community, and emphasized its defensive aspect in synchrony with later 20th century Islamic writers. Today, some Muslim authors only recognize wars fought for the purpose of territorial defense as well as wars fought for the defense of religious freedom as legitimate.

Ibn Taymiyyah's hallmark themes included the permissibility of overthrowing a ruler who is classified as an unbeliever due to a failure to adhere to Islamic law, the absolute division of the world into dar al-kufr and dar al-Islam, the labeling of anyone not adhering to one's particular interpretation of Islam as an unbeliever, and the call for blanket warfare against Non-Muslims, particularly Jews and Christians.

Ibn Taymiyyah recognized "the possibility of a jihad against `heretical` and `deviant` Muslims within dar al-Islam. He identified as heretical and deviant Muslims anyone who propagated innovations (bida') contrary to the Quran and Sunna ... legitimated jihad against anyone who refused to abide by Islamic law or revolted against the true Muslim authorities."
He used a very "broad definition" of what constituted aggression or rebellion against Muslims, which would make jihad "not only permissible but necessary." Ibn Taymiyyah also paid careful and lengthy attention to the questions of martyrdom and the benefits of jihad: 'It is in jihad that one can live and die in ultimate happiness, both in this world and in the Hereafter. Abandoning it means losing entirely or partially both kinds of happiness.`

Bernard Lewis states that while most Islamic theologians in the classical period (750–1258 CE) understood jihad to be a military endeavor, after Islamic conquest stagnated and the caliphate broke up into smaller states the "irresistible and permanent jihad came to an end". As jihad became unfeasible it was "postponed from historic to messianic time." Even when the Ottoman Empire carried on a new holy war of expansion in the seventeenth century, "the war was not universally pursued". They made no attempt to recover Spain or Sicily.

By the 1500s, it had become accepted that the permanent state of relations between dar al-Islam and dar al-harb was that of peace.

Shah Ismail of the Safavid dynasty tried to claim the right to wage offensive jihad, particularly against the Ottomans. However, Shia ulama did not permit that, maintaining the classical position that the true Imam could wage such a war. During the Qajar period, Shia ulama adopted the position that the Shah was responsible for national security. They authorized the Perso-Russian wars in the 19th century as jihad.

In the 18th century, the Durrani Empire under the reigns of Ahmad Shah Durrani and his son and successor, Timur Shah Durrani had issued multiple jihads against Sikh Misls in the Punjab region, often to consolidate territory and continue Afghan rule in the region, efforts under Ahmad Shah failed, while Timur Shah had succeeded.

Colonialism and modernism

When Europeans began the colonization of the Muslim world, jihad was one of the first responses by local Muslims. Emir Abdelkader organized a jihad in Algeria against French domination, tapping into existing Sufi networks. Other wars against colonialist powers were often declared to be jihad: the Senussi religious order declared jihad against Italian control of Libya in 1912, and the "Mahdi" in the Sudan declared jihad against both the British and the Egyptians in 1881.

Rashid Rida and Muhammad Abduh argued that peaceful coexistence should be the normal state between Muslim and non-Muslim states, citing verses in the Qur'an that allowed war only in self-defense. However, this view still left open jihad against colonialism, which was seen as an attack on Muslims.

Sayyid Ahmad Khan also argued jihad was limited to cases of oppression, and since the British Raj allowed freedom of religion, there was no need to wage jihad against the British. Instead, Khan formulated jihad as recovering past Muslim scientific progress to modernize the Muslim world.

A concept that played a role in anti-colonial jihad (or lack thereof) was the belief in Mahdi. According to Islamic eschatology, a messianic figure named Mahdi will appear and restore justice on earth. Such a belief sometimes discouraged Muslims from conducting jihad against the colonial powers, instead inducing them to passively wait for the messiah to come. Such messages were circulated in Algeria to undermine Emir Abdelkader's jihad against the French. On the other hand, this belief could be a powerful mobilizing force in cases when someone would proclaim himself Mahdi. Such mahdist rebellions happened in India (1810), Egypt (1865) and Sudan (1881).

With the Islamic revival, a new "fundamentalist" movement arose, with some different interpretations of Islam, which often placed an increased emphasis on jihad. The Wahhabi movement which spread across the Arabian peninsula starting in the 18th century, emphasized jihad as armed struggle. The so-called Fulbe jihad states and a few other jihad states in West Africa were established by a series of offensive wars in the 19th century. None of these jihad movements were victorious. The most powerful, the Sokoto Caliphate, lasted about a century until being incorporated into Colonial Nigeria in 1903.

When the Ottoman caliph called for a "Great Jihad" by all Muslims against Allied powers during World War I, there were hopes and fears that non-Turkish Muslims would side with Ottoman Turkey, but the appeal did not "[unite] the Muslim world", and Muslims did not turn on their non-Muslim commanders in the Allied forces. (The war led to the end of the caliphate as the Ottoman Empire entered on the side of the war's losers and surrendered by agreeing to "viciously punitive" conditions. These were overturned by the popular war hero Mustafa Kemal, who was also a secularist and later abolished the caliphate.)

Prior to the Iranian revolution in 1922, the Shiite cleric Mehdi Al-Khalissi issued a fatwa calling upon Iraqis not to participate in the Iraqi elections, as the Iraqi government was established by foreign powers. He later played a role in the Iraqi revolt of 1920. Between 1918 and 1919 in the Shia holy city of Najaf the League of the Islamic Awakening was established by several religious scholars, tribal chiefs, and landlords assassinated a British officer in the hopes of sparking a similar rebellion in Karbala which is also regarded as sacred for Shias.

During the Iraqi revolt of 1920, Grand Ayatollah Muhammad Taqi Shirazi the father of Mohammad al-Husayni al-Shirazi and grandfather of Sadiq Hussaini Shirazi, declared British rule impermissible and called for a jihad against European occupations in the Middle East.

Post-colonialism

Islamism has played an increasingly role in the Muslim world in the 20th century, especially following the economic crises of the 1970s and 1980s. One of the first Islamist groups, the Muslim Brotherhood, emphasized physical struggle and martyrdom in its creed: "God is our objective; the Quran is our constitution; the Prophet is our leader; struggle (jihad) is our way; and death for the sake of God is the highest of our aspirations." Hassan al-Banna emphasized jihad of the sword, and called on Egyptians to prepare for jihad against the British Empire, (making him the first influential scholar since the 1857 India uprising to call for jihad of the sword). The group called for jihad against Israel in the 1940s, and its Palestinian branch, Hamas, called for jihad against Israel when the First Intifada started.

Modern Muslim thought had been focused on when to go to war (jus ad bellum), not paying much attention on conduct during war (jus in bello). This was because most Muslim theorists viewed international humanitarian law as consistent with Islamic requirements. However, recently Muslims have once again started discussing conduct during war in response to certain terrorist groups targeting civilians.

According to Rudolph F. Peters and Natana J. DeLong-Bas, the new "fundamentalist" movement brought a reinterpretation of Islam and their own writings on jihad. These writings tended to be less interested and involved with legal arguments, what the different of schools of Islamic law had to say, or in solutions for all potential situations. "They emphasize more the moral justifications and the underlying ethical values of the rules, than the detailed elaboration of those rules." They also tended to ignore the distinction between Greater and Lesser jihad because it distracted Muslims "from the development of the combative spirit they believe is required to rid the Islamic world of Western influences".

Contemporary Islamic fundamentalists were often influenced by medieval Islamic jurist Ibn Taymiyyah's, and Egyptian journalist Sayyid Qutb's, ideas on jihad.

The highly influential Muslim Brotherhood leader, Sayyid Qutb, preached in his book Milestones that jihad, `is not a temporary phase but a permanent war ... Jihad for freedom cannot cease until the Satanic forces are put to an end and the religion is purified for God in toto.` Qutb focused on martyrdom and jihad, but he added the theme of the treachery and enmity towards Islam of Christians and especially Jews. If non-Muslims were waging a "war against Islam", jihad against them was not offensive but defensive. He also insisted that Christians and Jews were mushrikeen (not monotheists) because (he alleged) gave their priests or rabbis "authority to make laws, obeying laws which were made by them [and] not permitted by God" and "obedience to laws and judgments is a sort of worship".

Later ideologue, Muhammad abd-al-Salam Faraj, departed from some of Qutb's teachings on jihad. While Qutb felt that jihad was a proclamation of "liberation for humanity" (in which humanity has the free choice between Islam and unbelief), Faraj saw jihad as a mean of conquering the world and reestablishing the caliphate. Faraj legitimized lying, attacking by night (even if it leads to accidentally killing innocents), and destroying trees of the infidel. His ideas influenced Egyptian Islamist extremist groups, and Ayman al-Zawahiri, later the No. 2 person in al-Qaeda.

Many Muslims (including scholars like al-Qaradawi and Sayyid Tantawi) denounced Islamic terrorist attacks against civilians, seeing them as contrary to rules of jihad that prohibit targeting noncombatants.

During the Soviet invasion of Afghanistan, despite being a predominantly Sunni nation, Afghanistan's Shiite population took arms against the Communist government and allied Soviet forces like the nation's Sunnis and were collectively referred to as the Afghan Mujahideen. Shiite Jihadists in Afghanistan were known as the Tehran Eight and received support from the Iranian government in fighting against the Communist Afghan government and allied Soviet forces in Afghanistan.

Abdullah Azzam

In the 1980s Abdullah Azzam advocated waging jihad against the "unbelievers". Azzam issued a fatwa calling for jihad against the Soviet occupation of Afghanistan, declaring it an individual obligation for all able bodied Muslims because it was a defensive jihad to repel invaders. His fatwa was endorsed by a number of clerics including leading Saudi clerics such as Sheikh Abd al-Aziz ibn Baz.

Azzam claimed that "anyone who looks into the state of Muslims today will find that their great misfortune is their abandonment of Jihad", and he also warned that "without Jihad, shirk (joining partners with Allah) will spread and become dominant". Jihad was so important that to "repel" the unbelievers was "the most important obligation after Iman [faith]".

Azzam also argued for a broader interpretation of who it was permissible to kill in jihad, an interpretation that some think may have influenced some of his students, including Osama bin Laden.

A charismatic speaker, Azzam traveled to dozens of cities in Europe and North American to encourage support for jihad in Afghanistan. He inspired young Muslims with stories of miraculous deeds during jihad—mujahideen who defeated vast columns of Soviet troops virtually single-handed, who had been run over by tanks but survived, who were shot but unscathed by bullets. Angels were witnessed riding into battle on horseback, and falling bombs were intercepted by birds, which raced ahead of the jets to form a protective canopy over the warriors.
In Afghanistan he set up a "services office" for foreign fighters and with support from his former student Osama bin Laden and Saudi charities, foreign mujahideed or would-be mujahideen were provided for. Between 1982 and 1992 an estimated 35,000 individual Muslim volunteers went to Afghanistan to fight the Soviets and their Afghan regime. Thousands more attended frontier schools teeming with former and future fighters. Saudi Arabia and the other conservative Gulf monarchies also provided considerable financial support to the jihad—$600 million a year by 1982. CIA also funded Azzam's Maktab al-Khidamat and others via Operation Cyclone.

Azzam saw Afghanistan as the beginning of jihad to repel unbelievers from many countries—the southern Soviet Republics of Central Asia, Bosnia, the Philippines, Kashmir, Somalia, Eritrea, Spain, and especially his home country of Palestine. The defeat of the Soviets in Afghanistan is said to have "amplified the jihadist tendency from a fringe phenomenon to a major force in the Muslim world."

Having tasted victory in Afghanistan, many of the thousands of fighters returned to their home country such as Egypt, Algeria, Kashmir or to places like Bosnia to continue jihad. Not all the former fighters agreed with Azzam's chioice of targets (Azzam was assassinated in November 1989) but former Afghan fighters led or participated in serious insurgencies in Egypt, Algeria, Kashmir, Somalia in the 1990s and later creating a "transnational jihadist stream."

In February 1998, Osama bin Laden put a "Declaration of the World Islamic Front for Jihad against the Jews and the Crusaders" in the Al-Quds al-Arabi newspaper. On 11 September 2001, four passenger planes were hijacked in the United States and crashed, destroying the World Trade Center and damaging the Pentagon.

Shia
In Shia Islam, jihad is one of the ten Practices of the Religion (though not one of the five pillars). Traditionally, Twelver Shi'a doctrine has differed from that of Sunni Islam on the concept of jihad, with jihad being "seen as a lesser priority" in Shia theology and "armed activism" by Shias being "limited to a person's immediate geography".

Because of their history of being oppressed, Shias also associated jihad with certain passionate features, notably in the remembrance of Ashura. Mahmoud M. Ayoub says:

In Islamic tradition jihad or the struggle in the way of God, whether as armed struggle, or any form of opposition of the wrong, is generally regarded as one of the essential requirements of a person's faith as a Muslim. Shi'î tradition carried this requirement a step further, making jihad one of the pillars or foundations (arkan) of religion. If, therefore, Husayn's struggle against the Umayyad regime must be regarded as an act of jihad, then, In the mind of devotees, the participation of the community in his suffering and its ascent to the truth of his message must also be regarded as an extension of the holy struggle of the Imam himself. The hadith from which we took the title of this chapter states this point very clearly. Ja'far al-Sadiq is said to have declared to al-Mufaddal, one of his closest disciples, 'The sigh of the sorrowful for the wrong done us is an act of praise (tasbih) [of God], his sorrow for us is an act of worship, and his keeping of our secret is a struggle (jihad) in the way of God'; the Imâm then added, 'This hadith should be inscribed in letters of gold'.

and

Hence, the concept of jihad (holy struggle) gained a deeper and more personal meaning. Whether through weeping, the composition and recitation of poetry, showing compassion and doing good to the poor or carrying arms, the Shi'i Muslim saw himself helping the Imam in his struggle against the wrong (zulm) and gaining for himself the same merit (thawab) of those who actually fought and died for him. The ta'ziyah, in its broader sense the sharing of the entire life of the suffering family of Muhammad, has become for the Shi'i community the true meaning of compassion.

In the Syrian civil war, Shia and Sunni fighters waged jihad against each other. In Yemen, the Houthi Movement has used appeals to jihad as part of their ideology as well as their recruitment.

Evolution of the term in Islamic jurisprudence
Some observers have noted the evolution in the rules of jihad—from the original "classical" doctrine to that of 21st century Salafi jihadism. According to the legal historian Sadarat Kadri, during the last couple of centuries, incremental changes in Islamic legal doctrine (developed by Islamists who otherwise condemn any bid‘ah (innovation) in religion), have "normalized" what was once "unthinkable". "The very idea that Muslims might blow themselves up for God was unheard of before 1983, and it was not until the early 1990s that anyone anywhere had tried to justify killing innocent Muslims who were not on a battlefield."

The first or the "classical" doctrine of jihad which was developed towards the end of the 8th century, emphasized the jihad of the sword (jihad bil-saif) rather than the "jihad of the heart", but it contained many legal restrictions which were developed from interpretations of both the Quran and the Hadith, such as detailed rules involving "the initiation, the conduct, the termination" of jihad, the treatment of prisoners, the distribution of booty, etc. Unless there was a sudden attack on the Muslim community, jihad was not a "personal obligation" (fard ayn); instead it was a "collective one" (fard al-kifaya), which had to be discharged "in the way of God" (fi sabil Allah), and it could only be directed by the caliph, "whose discretion over its conduct was all but absolute." (This was designed in part to avoid incidents like the Kharijia's jihad against and killing of Caliph Ali, since they deemed that he was no longer a Muslim). Martyrdom resulting from an attack on the enemy with no concern for your own safety was praiseworthy, but dying by your own hand (as opposed to the enemy's) merited a special place in Hell. The category of jihad which is considered to be a collective obligation is sometimes simplified as "offensive jihad" in Western texts.

Islamic theologian Abu Abdullah al-Muhajir has been identified as the key theorist and ideologue behind modern jihadist violence. His theological and legal justifications influenced Abu Musab al-Zarqawi of al-Qaeda as well as several jihadi terrorist groups, including ISIS. Zarqawi used a manuscript of al-Muhajir's ideas at AQI training camps that were later deployed by ISIS, referred to as The Jurisprudence of Jihad or The Jurisprudence of Blood.

The book has been described as rationalising "the murder of non-combatants" by The Guardians Mark Towsend, citing Salah al-Ansari of Quilliam, who notes: "There is a startling lack of study and concern regarding this abhorrent and dangerous text [The Jurisprudence of Blood] in almost all Western and Arab scholarship". Charlie Winter of The Atlantic describes it as a "theological playbook used to justify the group's abhorrent acts". He states:

Psychologist Chris E. Stout also discusses the al Muhajir-inspired text in his book, Terrorism, Political Violence, and Extremism. He assesses that jihadists regard their actions as being "for the greater good"; that they are in a "weakened in the earth" situation that renders terrorism a valid means of solution.

Current usage
The term 'jihad' has accrued both violent and non-violent meanings. According to John Esposito, it can simply mean striving to live a moral and virtuous life, spreading and defending Islam as well as fighting injustice and oppression, among other things. The relative importance of these two forms of jihad is a matter of controversy. Rudoph Peters writes that, in the contemporary world, traditionalist Muslims understand jihad from classical works on fiqh; modernist Muslims regard jihad as a just war in international law and emphasize its defensive aspects; and fundamentalists view it as an expansion of Islam and realization of Islamic ideals. David Cook writes that Muslims have understood jihad in a military sense, both in classical texts and in contemporary ones. For Cook the idea that jihad is primarily non-violent comes primarily from Sufi texts and the Western scholars who study them, or from Muslim apologists. Gallup has stated that its surveys show that the concept of jihad among Muslims "is considerably more nuanced than the single sense in which Western commentators invariably invoke the term."

Muslim public opinion
A poll by Gallup asked Muslims in eight countries what jihad meant to them. In Lebanon, Kuwait, Jordan, and Morocco, the most frequent response was to "duty toward God", a "divine duty", or a "worship of God", with no militaristic connotations. In Turkey, Iran, Pakistan and Indonesia, many of the responses includes "sacrificing one's life for the sake of Islam/God/a just cause" or "fighting against the opponents of Islam". Other common meanings of "jihad" in the Muslim world include "a commitment to hard work", "promoting peace", and "living the principles of Islam". The terminology is also applied to the fight for women's liberation.

Other spiritual, social, economic struggles
Shia Muslim scholar Mahmoud M. Ayoud states that "The goal of true jihad is to attain a harmony between Islam (submission), iman (faith), and ihsan (righteous living)." Jihad is a process encompassing both individual and social reform, this is called jihad fi sabil Allah ("struggle in the way of God"), and can be undertaken by the means of the Quran (jihad bi-al-qur'an). According to Ayoud the greatest Jihad is the struggle of every Muslim against the social, moral, and political evils. However, depending on social and political circumstances, Jihad may be regarded as a sixth fundamental obligation (farid) incumbent on the entire Muslim community (ummah) when their integrity is in danger, in this case jihad becomes an "absolute obligation" (fard 'ayn), or when social and religious reform is gravely hampered. Otherwise it is a "limited obligation" (fard kifayah), incumbent upon those who are directly involved. These rules apply to armed struggle or "jihad of the sword".

In modern times, Pakistani scholar and professor Fazlur Rahman Malik has used the term to describe the struggle to establish a "just moral-social order", while President Habib Bourguiba of Tunisia has used it to describe the struggle for economic development in that country.

According to the BBC, a third meaning of jihad is the struggle to build a good society. In a commentary of the hadith Sahih Muslim, entitled al-Minhaj, the medieval Islamic scholar Yahya ibn Sharaf al-Nawawi stated that "one of the collective duties of the community as a whole (fard kifaya) is to lodge a valid protest, to solve problems of religion, to have knowledge of Divine Law, to command what is right and forbid wrong conduct".

Scholar Natana J. Delong-Bas lists a number of types of "jihad" that have been proposed by Muslims
 educational jihad (jihad al-tarbiyyah);
 missionary jihad or calling the people to Islam (jihad al-da'wah)

Other "types" mentioned include
 "Intellectual" Jihad (very similar to missionary jihad).
 "Economic" Jihad (good doing involving money such as spending within one's means, helping the "poor and the downtrodden") President Habib Bourguiba of Tunisia, used jihad to describe the struggle for economic development in Tunisia. Iran has a Ministry of Jihad for Agriculture.
 Jihad Al-Nikah, or sexual jihad, "refers to women joining the jihad by offering sex to fighters to boost their morale". The term originated from a fatwa believed to have been fabricated by the Syrian government to discredit its opponents, and the prevalence of this phenomenon has been disputed.

Usage by some non-Muslims
 The United States Department of Justice has used its own ad hoc definitions of jihad in indictments of individuals involved in terrorist activities:
 "As used in this First Superseding Indictment, 'Jihad' is the Arabic word meaning 'holy war'. In this context, jihad refers to the use of violence, including paramilitary action against persons, governments deemed to be enemies of the fundamentalist version of Islam."
 "As used in this Superseding Indictment, 'violent jihad' or 'jihad' include planning, preparing for, and engaging in, acts of physical violence, including murder, maiming, kidnapping, and hostage-taking." in the indictment against several individuals including José Padilla.
 "Fighting and warfare might sometimes be necessary, but it was only a minor part of the whole jihad or struggle," according to Karen Armstrong.
 "Jihad is a propagandistic device which, as need be, resorts to armed struggle—two ingredients common to many ideological movements," according to Maxime Rodinson.
 Academic Benjamin R. Barber used the term Jihad to point out the resistant movement by fundamentalist ethnic groups who want to protect their traditions, heritage and identity from globalization (which he refers to as 'McWorld').

Views of other groups

Ahmadiyya

In Ahmadiyya Islam, jihad is primarily one's personal inner struggle and should not be used violently for political motives. Violence is the last option only to be used to protect religion and one's own life in extreme situations of persecution.

Quranist
Quranists do not believe that the word jihad means holy war. They believe it means to struggle, or to strive. They believe it can incorporate both military and non-military aspects. When it refers to the military aspect, it is understood primarily as defensive warfare.

See also
 Ijtihad
 Islam and war
 Islamic military jurisprudence
 Jihadism and hip-hop
 Jihad Cool
 Religious war
 Milkhemet Mitzvah

References

Citations

Sources 

 "Djihad" in: The Encyclopaedia of Islam

Further reading

 Biancamaria Scarcia Amoretti, Tolleranza e guerra santa nell'Islam, Scuola aperta/Sansoni, Firenze, 1974
 David Cook Understanding Jihad, Berkeley: University of California Press, 2005.
 Hadia Dajani-Shakeel and Ronald Messier (1991). The Jihad and Its Times. Ann Arbor: Center for Near Eastern and North African Studies, University of Michigan.
 DeLong-Bas, Natana (2010). Jihad: Oxford Bibliographies Online Research Guide. Oxford University Press
 Reuven Firestone: Jihad: The Origin of Holy War in Islam. New York: Oxford University Press, 1999.
 Hashami, Sohail H., ed. Just Wars, Holy Wars, and Jihads: Christian, Jewish, and Muslim Encounters and Exchanges (Oxford University Press; 2012)

 John Kelsay: Just War and Jihad New York: Greenwood Press, 1991.
 Shiraz Maher, Salafi-Jihadism: The History of an Idea, Oxford University Press, 2016
 Suhas Majumdar: Jihad: The Islamic Doctrine of Permanent War; New Delhi, July 1994
 
 Nicola Melis, "A Hanafi treatise on rebellion and ğihād in the Ottoman age (XVII c.)", in Eurasian Studies, Istituto per l'Oriente/Newham College, Roma-Napoli-Cambridge, Volume II; Number 2 (December 2003), pp. 215–26.

 Alfred Morabia, Le Ğihâd dans l'Islâm médiéval. "Le combat sacré" des origines au XIIe siècle, Albin Michel, Paris 1993

External links 
 
 
 

 
Arabic words and phrases
Arabic words and phrases in Sharia
Islamic terminology
Sharia legal terminology